Geoffroy Saint-Hilaire describes the Amazonian umbrellabird in Annales Muséum National D'Histoire Naturelle, par les professeurs de cet éstablissement.Ouvrage orné de gravures.
The bird collection of the Muséum national d'histoire naturelle bird collection reaches  3411 specimens. At this date it is the largest in the world.
Johann Matthäus Bechstein completes  Gemeinnützige Naturgeschichte Deutschlands nach allen drey Reichen.
Margaret Bentinck, Duchess of Portland patroness of natural history dies.
Marie Jules César Savigny describes Pharaoh's eagle-owl and the eastern imperial eagle in Description de l'Égypte the work  describing the scientific discoveries of   Emperor Napoleon's  French campaign in Egypt and Syria
Louis Jean Pierre Vieillot describes  the Louisiana waterthrush and other North American birds in Histoire naturelle des oiseaux de l'Amérique Septentrionale  (1807 1808 1809) using  material gathered when he  fled to the United States during the French Revolution
Johann Centurius Hoffmannsegg founds the zoological museum of Berlin.

Birding and ornithology by year
1809 in science